Lemyra jiangxiensis is a moth of the family Erebidae. It was described by Cheng-Lai Fang in 1990. It is found in China in Guangdong, Jiangxi, Hunan, Shanghai and Zhejiang.

Subspecies
Lemyra jiangxiensis jiangxiensis (China: Jiangxi, Hunan, Shanghai, Zhejiang)
Lemyra jiangxiensis fangae Dubatolov, Kishida & Wang, 2008 (China: Guangdong)

References

 

jiangxiensis
Moths described in 1990